The Winchester Three were three young Irish citizens (Martina Shanahan, Finbar Cullen and John McCann) who were found guilty in 1988 of a plot to murder British politician Tom King, who was the Northern Ireland Secretary at the time, and sentenced to 25 years in prison. Their convictions were later quashed by the Court of Appeal, after having served two-and-a-half years. The decision was criticised by Lord Denning.

References

People imprisoned during the Northern Ireland conflict
1988 in England
1988 in Northern Ireland
1988 in British law
1990 in Northern Ireland
1990 in England
1990 in British law
Winchester
Overturned convictions in England
Quantified groups of defendants
Court of Appeal (England and Wales) cases